Blaise Ndala is a Canadian writer. He is most noted for his novel Sans capote ni kalachnikov, which won the 2019 edition of Le Combat des livres.

Originally from the Democratic Republic of the Congo, Ndala emigrated to Canada in 2007 and works as a lawyer in Ottawa. His debut novel, J'irai danser sur la tombe de Senghor, was published in 2014; it won the Ottawa Book Award for French fiction, and was a finalist for the Trillium Award. The novel was subsequently optioned for a film adaptation by director Rachid Bouchareb.

Sans capote ni kalachnikov was published in 2017, and was a finalist for the Trillium Award and the Grand prix littéraire d'Afrique noire. In Le Combat des livres, the novel was defended by journalist Marie-Maude Denis.

References

21st-century Canadian novelists
21st-century Canadian male writers
Canadian male novelists
Canadian novelists in French
Democratic Republic of the Congo novelists
Democratic Republic of the Congo male writers
Democratic Republic of the Congo emigrants to Canada
Black Canadian writers
Franco-Ontarian people
Writers from Ottawa
Living people
Year of birth missing (living people)